Implicit atheism and explicit atheism are types of atheism. In George H. Smith's Atheism: The Case Against God, "implicit atheism" is defined as "the absence of theistic belief without a conscious rejection of it", while "explicit atheism" is "the absence of theistic belief due to a conscious rejection of it". Explicit atheists have considered the idea of deities and have rejected belief that any exist. Implicit atheists, though they do not themselves maintain a belief in a god or gods, have not rejected the notion or have not considered it further.

Implicit atheism 
"Implicit atheism" is "the absence of theistic belief without a conscious rejection of it". "Absence of theistic belief" encompasses all forms of non-belief in deities. This would categorize as implicit atheists those adults who have never heard of the concept of deities, and those adults who have not given the idea any real consideration. Also included are agnostics who assert they do not believe in any deities (even if they claim not to be atheists), and children. As far back as 1772, Baron d'Holbach said that "All children are born Atheists; they have no idea of God". Smith is silent on newborn children, but clearly identifies as atheists some children who are unaware of any concept of any deity:

Explicit atheism 
Smith observes that some motivations for explicit atheism are rational and some not. Of the rational motivations, he says:

For Smith, critical, explicit atheism is subdivided further into three groups:
 the view usually expressed by the statement "I do not believe in the existence of a god or supernatural being" after "the failure of theism to provide sufficient evidence in its favor. Faced with a lack of evidence, this explicit atheist sees no reason whatsoever for believing in a supernatural being";
 the view usually expressed by the statement "God does not exist" or "the existence of God is impossible" after "a particular concept of god, such as the God of Christianity, is judged to be absurd or contradictory";
 the view which "refuses to discuss the existence or nonexistence of a god" because "the concept of a 'god' is unintelligible".

For the purposes of his paper on "philosophical atheism", Ernest Nagel chose to attach only the explicit atheism definition for his examination and discussion:

In Nagel's Philosophical Concepts of Atheism, he very much agrees with Smith on the three-part subdivision of "explicit atheism" above, though Nagel does not use the term "explicit".

Other typologies of atheism 

The specific narrow focus on positive atheism taken by some professional philosophers like Nagel on the one hand, compared with the scholarship on traditional negative atheism of freethinkers like d'Holbach and Smith on the other has been attributed to the different concerns of professional philosophers and layman proponents of atheism, 

Everitt (2004) makes the point that professional philosophers are more interested in the grounds for giving or withholding assent to propositions:
 We need to distinguish between a biographical or sociological enquiry into why some people have believed or disbelieved in God, and an epistemological enquiry into whether there are any good reasons for either belief or unbelief... We are interested in the question of what good reasons there are for or against God's existence, and no light is thrown on that question by discovering people who hold their beliefs without having good reasons for them. 

So, sometimes in philosophy (Flew, Martin and Nagel notwithstanding), only the explicit "denial of theistic belief" is examined, rather than the broader, implicit subject of atheism.

The terms "weak atheism" and "strong atheism", also known as "negative atheism" and "positive atheism", are usually used by Smith as synonyms of the less well-known "implicit" and "explicit" categories. "Strong explicit" atheists assert that it is false that any deities exist. "Weak explicit" atheists assert they do not believe in deities, and do not assert it is true that deities do not exist. Those who do not believe any deities exist, and do not assert their non-belief are included among implicit atheists. Among weak implicit atheists are included the following: children and adults who have never heard of deities; people who have heard of deities but have never given the idea any considerable thought; and those agnostics who suspend belief about deities, but do not reject such belief.

See also 
 Agnosticism
 Apatheism
 Ignosticism
 Nontheism

Further reading 
 Implicit theism in the social science of belief and nonbelief 
 An introduction to atheism secularity and science
Implicit Religion?
Are atheists implicit theists?

References 

Atheism
Philosophy of religion